Anjarakandy is  a census town and grama panchayat in Kannur district of Kerala, India. Anjarakandy river is flowing through Anjarakandy town.

History
The village includes Anjarakandy Cinnamon Estate, established by the East India Company in 1767. The estate, reputed to be Asia's largest, and the associated processing plant are still operational. Visitors are permitted to view the process of preparing cinnamon spice and extraction of oil. The local king, Pazhassi Raja and the British East India Company waged war for control of the estate.

Lord Brown of east India Company started a system of keeping a record of land transactions done by him to open Anjarakandy Cinnamon estate triggered opening up of a new Department of Land Registration in British Government in Asia region, This Land Registrar's office is located at Anjarakandy in a 252-year-old building built in 1767 

Anjarakandy is home to the Kannur medical college which is a super-speciality hospital. and Anjarakandy Higher secondary school - One of the best government-aided high school in the state of Kerala.

Demographics 

As of the 2011 Census of India, Ancharakandy had a population of 23,030 which constitutes 10,646 (46.2%) males and 12,384 (53.8%) females. Ancharakandy census town spreads over an area of 15.45 km2 with 5,245 families residing in it. The male female sex ratio was 1.163, higher than state average of 1.084. 
In Ancharakandy, 10.3% of the population is under 6 years age. Ancharakandy had an overall literacy of 97.3% higher than state average of 94%. The male literacy stands at 98.5% and female literacy was 96.3%.

Religion
As of 2011 census, Ancharakandy census town had total population of 23,030 among which 82.75% are Hindus, 16.8% are Muslims and 0.45% others.

History
The village includes Ancharakandy Cinnamon Estate, established by the East India Company in 1767. The estate, reputed to be Asia's largest, and associated processing plant are still operational and visitors can view the process of preparing cinnamon spice and extraction of oil.

Asia's first Land Registrar's office is located in a 252-year-old building built in 1767 by Lord Brown. The Kannur medical college, established in 2006, is equipped with a 500-bed super-speciality hospital.
and Kannur dental college and super speciality hospital, Malabar institute of technology were established in 2010.

Educational institutions
Malabar Institute of Technology 
The Kannur medical college is also a super-speciality hospital.
Anjarakandy Higher Secondary School is located in Anjarakandy Village.
Mamba Central LP School is also situated in Mamba village. It has classes from Standard 1 to 5. Established in 1881 by Sri Kunhikkannan Ezhuthachan. This school received the "Best LP school in Kannur District" award.
Kannur Dental College, College of Nursing -Kannur Medical College, Institute of Paramedical Sciences, College of Pharmacy -Kannur Medical College,

Anjarakandy, being easily accessible from nearby places such as Thalassery, Iritty, Koothuparamba and Kannur, is a central location for providing professional education. The prominent professional education institution in Anjrakandy is the Anjarakandy Integrated Campus.

Transportation
The national highway passes through Kannur city.  Mangalore, Goa and Mumbai can be accessed on the northern side and Cochin and Thiruvananthapuram can be accessed on the southern side.  The major roads passing through Anjarakandi town are Thazhe Chovva-Mattannur road which connects  Kannur city and Mattannur town and Kannur International Airport, and Thalassery-Irikkur road which connects to cities of Mysore and Bangalore. The nearest railway station is Thalassery on Mangalore-Palakkad line. 
Trains are available to almost all parts of India subject to advance booking over the internet.  There are airports at Kannur International Airport at Mattannur,  from Anjarakkandy town, Mangalore and Calicut. All of them are international airports but direct flights are available only to Middle Eastern countries.

References

Cities and towns in Kannur district
Villages near Kannur airport